St. Paul is a town in Russell and Wise counties in the U.S. state of Virginia.  The population was 970 at the 2010 census.  Virginia City Hybrid Energy Center, which powers 150,000 homes, is located in St. Paul.

History
The St. Paul Historic District and Virginia City Church are listed on the National Register of Historic Places.

Geography
According to the United States Census Bureau, the town has a total area of 1.0 square miles (2.6 km2), of which, 1.0 square miles (2.5 km2) of it is land and 0.04 square miles (0.1 km2) of it (3.92%) is water.

Demographics

As of the census of 2000, there were 1,000 people, 464 households, and 302 families living in the town. The population density was 1,023.2 people per square mile (394.0/km2). There were 496 housing units at an average density of 507.5 per square mile (195.4/km2). The racial makeup of the town was 95.70% White, 1.80% African American, 0.60% Native American, 0.50% Asian, 0.10% from other races, and 1.30% from two or more races. Hispanic or Latino of any race were 0.50% of the population.

There were 464 households, out of which 28.7% had children under the age of 18 living with them, 48.5% were married couples living together, 12.3% had a female householder with no husband present, and 34.9% were non-families. 33.4% of all households were made up of individuals, and 17.7% had someone living alone who was 65 years of age or older. The average household size was 2.16 and the average family size was 2.72.

In the town, the population was spread out, with 21.6% under the age of 18, 9.7% from 18 to 24, 24.1% from 25 to 44, 25.0% from 45 to 64, and 19.6% who were 65 years of age or older. The median age was 42 years. For every 100 females, there were 82.8 males. For every 100 females age 18 and over, there were 81.1 males.

The median income for a household in the town was $24,833, and the median income for a family was $39,125. Males had a median income of $31,563 versus $25,313 for females. The per capita income for the town was $17,735. About 15.1% of families and 19.3% of the population were below the poverty line, including 27.4% of those under age 18 and 15.2% of those age 65 or over.

Education

St. Paul is home to one public school, St. Paul Elementary School. The school features unique programs such as the Wetlands Estonoa Project.

Attractions

Natural and outdoor recreation
 Clinch River
 Matthews Park
 Oxbow Lake
 Sugar Hill Loop Trail
 Wetlands Estonoa and the Wetlands Estonoa Project
 Spearhead Trail
 Ridge Runner Campground

Historical
 Railroad Museum

Festivals and celebrations
 Clinch River Days
 Fourth of July Celebration

Periodical
St. Paul is home to an online newspaper, the Clinch Valley Times.

Notable people
 Steven Jason Williams, also known as Boogie2988  (born July 24, 1974), a YouTuber, video blogger and comedian, is originally from St. Paul.

References

External links
 St. Paul Official Website

Towns in Russell County, Virginia
Towns in Virginia
Towns in Wise County, Virginia